Stepnyak (Stepniak) is a town and the administrative center of Enbekshilder District in Aqmola Region of central Kazakhstan. Population:

References

Populated places in Akmola Region